Eudonia triclera is a moth in the family Crambidae. It was described by Edward Meyrick in 1905. It is endemic to New Zealand.

The forewings are blackish-fuscous mixed with whitish. There is a small pale ochreous elongated subbasal spot in the middle and a broad ochreous-white postmedian band parallel to the termen. The subterminal line is whitish. The hindwings are dark fuscous.

References

Moths described in 1905
Eudonia
Moths of New Zealand
Endemic fauna of New Zealand
Taxa named by Edward Meyrick
Endemic moths of New Zealand